The 1966 North Carolina Tar Heels baseball team represented University of North Carolina at Chapel Hill in the 1966 NCAA University Division baseball season. The Tar Heels played their home games at Emerson Field. The team was coached by Walter Rabb in his 20th year as head coach at North Carolina.

The Tar Heels won the District III playoff to advance to the College World Series, where they were defeated by the Oklahoma State Cowboys.

Roster

Schedule

|-
! style="" | Regular Season
|-

|-
! bgcolor="#DDDDFF" width="3%" | #
! bgcolor="#DDDDFF" width="7%" | Date
! bgcolor="#DDDDFF" width="14%" | Opponent
! bgcolor="#DDDDFF" width="25%" | Site/Stadium
! bgcolor="#DDDDFF" width="5%" | Score
! bgcolor="#DDDDFF" width="5%" | Overall Record
! bgcolor="#DDDDFF" width="5%" | ACC Record
|- align="center" bgcolor="#ffcccc"
| 1 || March 18 || at  || ECU Baseball Field • Greenville, North Carolina || 3–5 || 0–1 || –
|- align="center" bgcolor="#ffcccc"
| 2 || March 23 ||  || Emerson Field • Chapel Hill, North Carolina || 3–1 || 0–2 || –
|- align="center" bgcolor="#ccffcc"
| 3 || March 25 ||  || Emerson Field • Chapel Hill, North Carolina || 3–2 || 1–2 || –
|- align="center" bgcolor="#ffcccc"
| 4 || March 26 || Virginia Tech || Emerson Field • Chapel Hill, North Carolina || 2–4 || 1–3 || –
|- align="center" bgcolor="#ccffcc"
| 5 || March 29 ||  || Emerson Field • Chapel Hill, North Carolina || 15–6 || 2–3 || –
|- align="center" bgcolor="#ccffcc"
| 6 || March 30 ||  || Emerson Field • Chapel Hill, North Carolina || 4–3 || 3–3 || –
|- align="center" bgcolor="#ccffcc"
| 7 || March 31 || Colby || Emerson Field • Chapel Hill, North Carolina || 6–5 || 4–3 || –
|-

|-
! bgcolor="#DDDDFF" width="3%" | #
! bgcolor="#DDDDFF" width="7%" | Date
! bgcolor="#DDDDFF" width="14%" | Opponent
! bgcolor="#DDDDFF" width="25%" | Site/Stadium
! bgcolor="#DDDDFF" width="5%" | Score
! bgcolor="#DDDDFF" width="5%" | Overall Record
! bgcolor="#DDDDFF" width="5%" | ACC Record
|- align="center" bgcolor="#ccffcc"
| 8 || April 2 || at  || Riddick Stadium • Raleigh, North Carolina || 8–2 || 5–3 || 1–0
|- align="center" bgcolor="#ffcccc"
| 9 || April 4 ||  || Emerson Field • Chapel Hill, North Carolina || 3–9 || 5–4 || 1–0
|- align="center" bgcolor="#ffcccc"
| 10 || April 5 || Connecticut || Emerson Field • Chapel Hill, North Carolina || 5–14 || 5–5 || 1–0
|- align="center" bgcolor="#ffcccc"
| 11 || April 7 || at  || Seminole Field • Tallahassee, Florida || 7–15 || 5–6 || 1–0
|- align="center" bgcolor="#ccffcc"
| 12 || April 7 || at Florida State || Seminole Field • Tallahassee, Florida || 6–4 || 6–6 || 1–0
|- align="center" bgcolor="#ffcccc"
| 13 || April 7 || at Florida State || Seminole Field • Tallahassee, Florida || 1–4 || 6–7 || 1–0
|- align="center" bgcolor="#ccffcc"
| 14 || April 11 || at  || Rose Bowl Field • Atlanta, Georgia || 3–0 || 7–7 || 1–0
|- align="center" bgcolor="#ccffcc"
| 15 || April 15 ||  || Emerson Field • Chapel Hill, North Carolina || 6–1 || 8–7 || 2–0
|- align="center" bgcolor="#ffcccc"
| 16 || April 16 ||  || Emerson Field • Chapel Hill, North Carolina || 0–1 || 8–8 || 2–1
|- align="center" bgcolor="#ccffcc"
| 17 || April 19 || at  || Jack Coombs Field • Durham, North Carolina || 8–1 || 9–8 || 3–1
|- align="center" bgcolor="#ccffcc"
| 18 || April 22 ||  || Emerson Field • Chapel Hill, North Carolina || 8–3 || 10–8 || 4–1
|- align="center" bgcolor="#ccffcc"
| 19 || April 23 ||  || Emerson Field • Chapel Hill, North Carolina || 3–2 || 11–8 || 5–1
|- align="center" bgcolor="#ccffcc"
| 20 || April 26 || NC State || Emerson Field • Chapel Hill, North Carolina || 11–4 || 12–8 || 6–1
|- align="center" bgcolor="#ccffcc"
| 21 || April 29 || at South Carolina || Unknown • Columbia, South Carolina || 1–0 || 13–8 || 7–1
|- align="center" bgcolor="#ccffcc"
| 22 || April 30 || at Clemson || Riggs Field • Clemson, South Carolina || 6–3 || 14–8 || 8–1
|-

|-
! bgcolor="#DDDDFF" width="3%" | #
! bgcolor="#DDDDFF" width="7%" | Date
! bgcolor="#DDDDFF" width="14%" | Opponent
! bgcolor="#DDDDFF" width="25%" | Site/Stadium
! bgcolor="#DDDDFF" width="5%" | Score
! bgcolor="#DDDDFF" width="5%" | Overall Record
! bgcolor="#DDDDFF" width="5%" | ACC Record
|- align="center" bgcolor="#ccffcc"
| 23 || May 3 || at  || Emerson Field • Chapel Hill, North Carolina || 4–0 || 15–8 || 9–1
|- align="center" bgcolor="#ccffcc"
| 24 || May 6 || at Maryland || Shipley Field • College Park, Maryland || 5–2 || 16–8 || 10–1
|- align="center" bgcolor="#ccffcc"
| 25 || May 7 || at Virginia || UVA Baseball Field • Charlottesville, Virginia || 2–1 || 17–8 || 11–1
|- align="center" bgcolor="#ccffcc"
| 26 || May 10 || Duke || Emerson Field • Chapel Hill, North Carolina || 10–4 || 18–8 || 12–1
|- align="center" bgcolor="#ffcccc"
| 27 || May 14 || at Wake Forest || Ernie Shore Field • Winston-Salem, North Carolina || 4–5 || 18–9 || 12–2
|- align="center" bgcolor="#ffcccc"
| 28 || May 18 || at Virginia Tech || Tech Park • Blacksburg, Virginia || 14–15 || 18–10 || 12–2
|-

|-
! style="" | Postseason
|-

|-
! bgcolor="#DDDDFF" width="3%" | #
! bgcolor="#DDDDFF" width="7%" | Date
! bgcolor="#DDDDFF" width="14%" | Opponent
! bgcolor="#DDDDFF" width="25%" | Site/Stadium
! bgcolor="#DDDDFF" width="5%" | Score
! bgcolor="#DDDDFF" width="5%" | Overall Record
! bgcolor="#DDDDFF" width="5%" | ACC Record
|- align="center" bgcolor="#ccffcc"
| 29 || June 2 || vs East Carolina || Sims Legion Park • Gastonia, North Carolina || 7–1 || 19–10 || 12–2
|- align="center" bgcolor="#ccffcc"
| 30 || June 3 || vs   || Sims Legion Park • Gastonia, North Carolina || 5–4 || 20–10 || 12–2
|- align="center" bgcolor="#ffcccc"
| 31 || June 4 || vs Florida State || Sims Legion Park • Gastonia, North Carolina || 5–6 || 20–11 || 12–2
|- align="center" bgcolor="#ccffcc"
| 32 || June 4 || vs Florida State || Sims Legion Park • Gastonia, North Carolina || 6–4 || 21–11 || 12–2
|-

|-
! bgcolor="#DDDDFF" width="3%" | #
! bgcolor="#DDDDFF" width="7%" | Date
! bgcolor="#DDDDFF" width="14%" | Opponent
! bgcolor="#DDDDFF" width="25%" | Site/Stadium
! bgcolor="#DDDDFF" width="5%" | Score
! bgcolor="#DDDDFF" width="5%" | Overall Record
! bgcolor="#DDDDFF" width="5%" | ACC Record
|- align="center" bgcolor="#ffcccc"
| 33 || June 13 || vs Southern California || Omaha Municipal Stadium • Omaha, Nebraska || 2–6 || 21–12 || 12–2
|- align="center" bgcolor="#ffcccc"
| 34 || June 14 || vs Oklahoma State || Omaha Municipal Stadium • Omaha, Nebraska || 1–5 || 21–13 || 12–2
|-

|-
|

Awards and honors
Charlie Carr
First Team All-ACC

Danny Talbott
First Team All-ACC
Second Team All-American

Danny Walker
First Team All-ACC

References

North Carolina Tar Heels baseball seasons
North Carolina Tar Heels baseball
College World Series seasons
North Carolina
Atlantic Coast Conference baseball champion seasons